This is a list of lords lieutenants of County Down. 

There were lieutenants of counties in Ireland until the reign of James II, when they were renamed governors. The office of Lord Lieutenant was recreated on 23 August 1831.

Governors

 Bryan Magennis, 5th Viscount Iveagh 1689–1691 (Jacobite)
 Wills Hill, 1st Marquess of Downshire –1793
 Robert Stewart, 1st Marquess of Londonderry 1793–1821 
 James Blackwood, 2nd Baron Dufferin and Claneboye: –1831
 Robert Ward: 1805–1831
 Charles Vane, 3rd Marquess of Londonderry: –1831

Lord Lieutenants
The 3rd Marquess of Downshire: 7 October 1831 – 12 April 1845
The 4th Marquess of Londonderry: 17 May 1845 – 1864
The Lord Dufferin and Clandeboye: 13 April 1864 – 12 February 1902, later Earl of Dufferin and Marquess of Dufferin and Ava
The 6th Marquess of Londonderry: 16 April 1902 – 8 February 1915
The 7th Marquess of Londonderry: 8 September 1915 – 11 February 1949
The 4th Earl of Kilmorey: 2 June 1949 – 1959
Sir Roland Nugent, 1st Bt.: 10 March 1959 – 18 August 1962
The 6th Earl of Clanwilliam: 25 September 1962 – 1979
Colonel William Norman Brann O.B.E, E.R.D, D.L.: 2 October 1979 – 1990
Colonel William Stephen Brownlow: 17 August 1990 – 1996
Sir William Joseph Hall: 10 October 1996 – 1 August 2009
David Lindsay: 25 August 2009 – 2021
Gawn William Rowan Hamilton: 12 May 2021 – present

Deputy lieutenants

A deputy lieutenant of County Down is commissioned by the Lord Lieutenant of County Down. Deputy lieutenants support the work of the lord-lieutenant. There can be several deputy lieutenants at any time, depending on the population of the county. Their appointment does not terminate with the changing of the lord-lieutenant, but they usually retire at age 75.

21st Century
19 May 2010: John Witchell
2 September 2016: Peter Campbell Conway
2 September 2016: Professor Neil McClure

References

 
History of County Down
People from County Down
Down